Ricardo Flores Magón is an elevated station on Line B of the Mexico City Metro system.

The logo for the station shows a portrait of Ricardo Flores Magón.  The station was opened on 15 December 1999.

Ridership

References

External links
 

Mexico City Metro Line B stations
Railway stations opened in 1999
1999 establishments in Mexico
Mexico City Metro stations in Venustiano Carranza, Mexico City
Accessible Mexico City Metro stations